Flavoleptus is a monotypic Indomalayan genus of potter wasps. The sole species is Flavoleptus flavobalteatus.

References

Potter wasps